Michael Ryan (born 1946 in St. Louis) has been teaching creative writing and literature at University of California, Irvine since 1990.

Life
He taught previously at the University of Iowa, Princeton University, the University of Virginia, and in the Warren Wilson College MFA Program for Writers. He is also a contributing editor at The Alaska Quarterly Review.  He is currently the director of the MFA program at the University of California, Irvine.

He has written four books of poems, an autobiography, a memoir, and a collection of essays about poetry and writing.

His work has appeared regularly in The American Poetry Review, The Alaska Quarterly Review, The Threepenny Review, The New Yorker, Poetry Magazine.

He currently lives in California with his wife, Doreen Gildroy, and their daughter, Emily.

Awards
 1974 Yale Series of Younger Poets Award for Threats Instead of Trees
 1980 National Poetry Series, In Winter
 1981 Guggenheim Fellowship
 1987 Whiting Award
 1990 Lenore Marshall Poetry Prize for God Hunger
 2005 Kingsley Tufts Poetry Award, for New and Selected Poems

Selected publications
 
 
 
New And Selected Poems. (Houghton Mifflin, 2004)
Baby B [memoir]. (Graywolf Press, 2004)A Difficult Grace: On Poets, Poetry, and Writing [essays]. (University of Georgia Press, 2000)Secret Life [autobiography]. (Pantheon, 1995; Vintage paperback, 1996)God Hunger [poems]. (Viking Penguin, 1989; paperback, 1990)In Winter [poems]. (Holt, 1981)Threats Instead of Trees'' [poems]. (Yale University Press, 1974)

References

External links
 "Michael Ryan", How a Poem Happens, February 9, 2009
 
 Whiting Foundation Profile

1946 births
Living people
American essayists
American male poets
Princeton University faculty
University of Virginia faculty
University of Iowa faculty
University of California, Irvine faculty
American male essayists